The First River is a river of Minnesota. It joins Little Cut Food Sioux Lake with First River Lake.

See also
List of rivers of Minnesota

References

External links 
Minnesota Watersheds
Rivers of Minnesota